The 2005 New Zealand general election on Saturday 17 September 2005 determined the membership of the 48th New Zealand Parliament. One hundred and twenty-one MPs were elected to the New Zealand House of Representatives: 69 from single-member electorates, including one overhang seat, and 52 from party lists (one extra due to the overhang).

No party won a majority, but the Labour Party of Prime Minister Helen Clark secured two more seats than nearest rival, the National Party of Dr Don Brash. With the exception of the newly formed Māori Party, which took four Māori electorates from Labour, most of the other parties polled lower than in the previous election, losing votes and seats.

Brash deferred conceding defeat until 1 October, when National's election-night 49 seats fell to 48 after special votes were counted. The official count increased the Māori Party share of the party vote above 2%, entitling them to three rather than two seats from the party vote. With four electorate seats, the election night overhang of two seats was reduced to one, and as National had the 120th seat allocated under the party vote, National lost one list seat (that of Katrina Shanks) that they appeared to have won on election night.

The election was a strong recovery for National which won 21 more seats than at the 2002 election, where it suffered its worst result in its history, and the highest party vote percentage for the party since 1990; indeed, National saw its first vote share gain since 1990. Despite its resurgence, National failed to displace Labour as the largest party in Parliament. National's gains apparently came mainly at the expense of smaller parties, while Labour won only two seats less than in 2002.

On 17 October, Clark announced a new coalition agreement that saw the return of her minority government coalition with the Progressive Party, with confidence and supply support from New Zealand First and from United Future.  New Zealand First parliamentary leader Winston Peters and United Future parliamentary leader Peter Dunne became ministers of the Crown outside Cabinet, Peters as Minister of Foreign Affairs and Dunne as Minister of Revenue.  The Green Party which had supported Labour before the election received no cabinet post (see below), but gained several concessions from the coalition on matters such as energy and transport, and agreed to support the government on matters of confidence and supply.

The election
The total votes cast in 2005 was 2,304,005 (2,164,595 & 139,510 Māori). Turnout was 80.92% of those on the rolls, or 77.05% of voting age population. Turnout was higher than in the previous 2002 election (72.5% and 76.98% respectively), and the Māori roll turnout at 67.07% was significantly higher than 2002 (57.5%).

In the election 739 candidates stood, and there were 19 registered parties with party lists. Of the candidates, 525 were electorate and list, 72 were electorate only and 142 were list only. All but 37 represented registered parties (on the list or in the electorate or both). Only 35 candidates from registered parties chose to stand as an electorate candidate only. 71% of candidates (523) were male and 29% (216) female; the same percentages as in 2002.

Labour had achieved a third term in office for the first time since 1943.

MPs retiring in 2005
Eight MPs intended to retire at the end of the 47th Parliament.

Detailed results

Parliamentary parties

| colspan=12 align=center| 
|- style="text-align:center;"
! colspan=2 rowspan=2 style="width:213px;" | Party
! Colspan=3 | Party vote
! Colspan=3 | Electorate vote
! Colspan=4 | Seats
|- style="text-align:center;"
! Votes
! %
! Change(pp)
! Votes
! %
! Change(pp)
! List
! Electorate
! Total
! +/-
|-
| 
| 935,319
| 41.10
| 0.16
| 902,072
| 40.35
| 4.34
| 19
| 31
| 50
| 2
|-
| 
| 889,813
| 39.10
| 18.17
| 902,874
| 40.38
| 9.84
| 17
| 31
| 48
| 21
|-
| 
| 130,115
| 5.72
| 4.66
| 78,117
| 3.49
| 0.49
| 7
| 0
| 7
| 6
|-
| 
| 120,521
| 5.30
| 1.70
| 92,164
| 4.12
| 1.23
| 6
| 0
| 6
| 3
|-
| 
| 48,263
| 2.12
| new
| 75,076
| 3.36
| new
| 0
| 4
| 4
| new
|-
| 
| 60,860
| 2.67
| 4.02
| 63,486
| 2.84
| 1.52
| 2
| 1
| 3
| 5
|-
| 
| 34,469
| 1.51
| 5.63
| 44,071
| 1.97
| 1.58
| 1
| 1
| 2
| 7
|-
| 
| 26,441
| 1.16
| 0.54
| 36,638
| 1.64
| 0.20
| 0
| 1
| 1
| 1
|-
| 
| 14,210
| 0.62
| new
| 17,608
| 0.79
| new
| 0
| 0
| 0
| new
|-
| 
| 5,748
| 0.25
| 0.39
| 2,601
| 0.12
| 0.05
| 0
| 0
| 0
| 
|-
| 
| 2,821
| 0.12
| 1.23
| 1,296
| 0.06
| 1.99
| 0
| 0
| 0
| 
|-
| 
| 1,641
| 0.07
| 1.20
| 1,901
| 0.09
| 1.60
| 
| 0
| 0
| 
|-
| 
| 1,178
| 0.05
| new
| 1,045
| 0.05
| new
| 0
| 0
| 0
| new
|-
| 
| 1,079
| 0.05
| new
| 565
| 0.03
| new
| 0
| 0
| 0
| new
|-
|
| 946
| 0.04
| 0.04
| 781
| 0.03
| 
| 0
| 0
| 0
| 
|-
| 
| 782
| 0.03
| new
| 1,934
| 0.09
| new
| 
| 0
| 0
| new
|-
| 
| 601
| 0.03
| new
| —
| —
| —
| 0
| 0
| 0
| new
|-
|
| 478
| 0.02
| 0.07
| 214
| 0.01
| 0.12
| 
| 0
| 0
| 
|-
| 
| 344
| 0.02
| new
| 131
| 0.01
| new
| 0
| 0
| 0
| new
|-
| style="background-color:#ffffff" |
| style="text-align:left;" |Unregistered parties
| —
| —
| —
| 1,466
| 0.07
| 0.12
| 0
| 0
| 0
| 
|-
| 
| —
| —
| —
| 11,829
| 0.53
| 0.22
| 0
| 0
| 0
| 
|-
! colspan=2 style="text-align:left;" | Valid votes
! 2,275,629
! 98.77
! 0.07
! 2,235,869
! 97.04
! 0.05
! Colspan=4 |
|-
| colspan=2 style="text-align:left;" | Informal votes
| 10,561
| 0.46
| 0.04
| 24,801
| 1.08
| 0.21
| Colspan=4 |
|-
| colspan=2 style="text-align:left;" | Disallowed votes
| 17,815
| 0.77
| 0.03
| 43,335
| 1.88
| 0.26
| Colspan=4 |
|-
! colspan=2 style="text-align:left;" | Total
! 2,304,005
! 100
!
! 2,304,005
! 100
!
! 52
! 69
! 121
! 1
|-
| colspan=2 style="text-align:left;" | Eligible voters and Turnout
| 2,847,396
| 80.92
| 3.94
| 2,847,396
| 80.92
| 3.94
| Colspan=4 |
|}

The election saw an 81% voter turnout.

The results of the election give a Gallagher index of disproportionality of 1.11.

Votes summary

Electorate results 

The table below shows the results of the 2005 general election:

Key:

|-
| colspan="10"  style="background:#eee; text-align:center;"| Māori electorates
|-
! Electorate !! colspan=2 | Incumbent !! colspan=2 | Winner !! Majority !! colspan=2 | Runner up
|-

|}

List results

MPs returned via party lists, and unsuccessful candidates, were as follows:

Notes
 These party list members later entered parliament in the term as other list MPs elected resigned from parliament.
 These party list members later resigned during the parliamentary term.

Changes during parliamentary term

Party vote by electorate

Analysis of results 
Going into the election, Labour had assurances of support from the Greens (six seats in 2005, down three from 2002) and from the Progressives (one seat, down one).  This three-party bloc won 57 seats, leaving Clark four seats short of the 61 seats needed for a majority in the 121-seat Parliament (decreased from the expected 122 because the final results gave the Māori Party only one overhang seat, after it appeared to win two overhang seats on election night).  On 5 October the Māori Party began a series of hui to decide whom to support.  That same day reports emerged that a meeting between Helen Clark and Māori co-leader Tariana Turia on 3 October had already ruled out a formal coalition between Labour and the Māori Party. Māori Party representatives also held discussions with National representatives, but most New Zealanders thought the Māori Party more likely to give confidence-supply support to a Labour-dominated government because its supporters apparently heavily backed Labour in the party vote.

Had Turia and her co-leader Pita Sharples opted to join a Labour-Progressive-Green coalition, Clark would have had sufficient support to govern with support from a grouping of four parties (Labour, Green, Māori and Progressive).  Without the Māori Party, Labour needed the support of New Zealand First (seven seats, down six) and United Future (three seats, down five) to form a government. New Zealand First said it would support (or at least abstain from opposing in confidence-motions) the party with the most seats. Clark sought from New Zealand First a positive commitment rather than abstention. United Future, which had supported the previous Labour-Progressive minority government in confidence and supply, said it would talk first to the party with the most seats about support or coalition.  Both New Zealand First and United Future said they would not support a Labour-led coalition which included Greens in Cabinet posts.  However, United Future indicated it could support a government where the Greens gave supply-and-confidence votes.

Brash had only one possible scenario to become Prime Minister: a centre-right coalition with United Future and ACT (two seats, down seven). Given the election results, however, such a coalition would have required the confidence-and-supply votes of both New Zealand First and the Māori Party.  This appeared highly unlikely on several counts.  New Zealand First's involvement in such a coalition would have run counter to Peters' promise to deal with the biggest party, and Turia and Sharples would have had difficulty in justifying supporting National after their supporters' overwhelming support for Labour in the party vote.  Turia and Sharples probably remembered the severe mauling New Zealand First suffered in the 1999 election. (Many of its supporters in 1996 believed they had voted to get rid of National, only to have Peters go into coalition with National; New Zealand First has never really recovered.) Even without this to consider, National had indicated it would abolish the Maori seats if it won power.

The new government as eventually formed consisted of Labour and Progressive in coalition, while New Zealand First and United Future entered agreements of support on confidence and supply motions.  In an unprecedented move, Peters and Dunne became Foreign Affairs Minister and Revenue Minister, respectively, but remained outside cabinet and had no obligatory cabinet collective responsibility on votes outside their respective portfolios.

Possible government setups

Background 

The governing Labour Party retained office at 2002 election. However, its junior coalition partner, the Alliance, lost most of its support after internal conflict and disagreement and failed to win parliamentary representation. Labour formed a coalition with the new Progressive Coalition, formed by former Alliance leader Jim Anderton. The Labour-Progressive coalition then obtained an agreement of support ("confidence and supply") from United Future, enabling it to form a stable minority government. The National Party, Labour's main opponents, suffered a major defeat, winning only 21% of the vote (22.5% of the seats).

The collapse of National's vote led ultimately to the replacement of its Parliamentary party leader Bill English with parliamentary newcomer Don Brash on 28 October 2003. Brash began an aggressive campaign against the Labour-dominated government. A major boost to this campaign came with his "Orewa speech" (27 January 2004), in which he attacked the Labour-dominated government for giving "special treatment" to the Māori population, particularly over the foreshore and seabed controversy. This resulted in a surge of support for the National Party, although most polls indicated that this subsequently subsided. National also announced it would not stand candidates in the Māori electorates, with some smaller parties following suit.

The foreshore-and-seabed controversy also resulted in the establishment of the Māori Party in July 2004. The Māori Party hoped to break Labour's traditional (and then current) dominance in the Māori electorates, just as New Zealand First had done in the 1996 election.

A large number of so-called "minor" parties also contested the election.  These included Destiny New Zealand (the political branch of the Destiny Church) and the Direct Democracy Party.

Polls 

A series of opinion polls published in June 2005 indicated that the National Party had moved ahead of Labour for the first time since June 2004. Commentators speculated that a prominent billboard campaign may have contributed to this. Some said the National Party had peaked too early. The polls released throughout July showed once more an upward trend for Labour, with Labour polling about 6% above National. The release by the National Party of a series of tax-reform proposals in August 2005 appeared to correlate with an increase in its ratings in the polls.

Direct comparisons between the following polls have no statistical validity:

No single political event can explain the significant differences between most of these polls over the period between them. They show either volatility in the electorate and/or flaws in the methods of polling. In the later polls, the issue of National's knowledge of a series of pamphlets (distributed by members of the Exclusive Brethren and attacking the Green and Labour parties) appeared not to have reduced National Party support.

Candidates 
For lists of candidates in the 2005 election see:
 Candidates grouped by electorate
 Candidates grouped by party list

Major policy platforms

Labour Party 
The Labour Party platform included:
 student loans: writing off interest if the recipient stays in New Zealand
 health: a pledge of extra public-hospital operations
 Treaty of Waitangi: accepting no lodgements for Treaty-claims after 1 September 2008
 increasing rates-rebates
 a "KiwiSaver" program, aimed at getting first homeowners into their own homes
 sponsoring 5,000 new apprenticeships
 increasing community police-force numbers by 250.
 a "Working for Families" tax-relief/benefit programme aimed at lower to middle-income families

National Party 
The National Party campaigned on the platform of (National Party Press Release):
 taxation: lowering income-tax rates. The party ran a television advertisement parodying the telethons aired by TVNZ in the 1980s, rewording the telethon theme song "Thank you very much for your kind donation" (itself a cover of the 1967 The Scaffolds song "Thank U Very Much") to "Thank you very much for your high taxation"
 removing references to the Treaty of Waitangi from existing legislation; and resolving all treaty claims amicably by 2010
 by 1 April 2006, make student-loan repayments and $5000 of pre-school childcare costs recoupable to mainstream New Zealanders
 "reworking" the New Zealand Resource Management Act 1991 to make development easier
 "removing excessive bureaucracy" in the education system, in particular by overhauling the NCEA, and by re-introducing "bulk funding" of schools
 abolishing early parole for violent criminals. (As of 2005 most prisoners became eligible for parole after serving one-third of their sentence)
 a return to "market rents" for state-housing tenants, including a system of paying housing-subsidies (for the poorest tenants) directly to private landlords
 increase Nationwide Maths and English standards
 welfare Reform – reduce the waste of having 300,000 working age New Zealand adults on benefits and to ensure all of those on benefits really need the help
 a "work-for-the-dole" scheme
 abolishing the Maori electorates

Voting 
Postal voting for New Zealanders abroad began on 31 August. Ballot voting took place on Saturday 17 September, from 9am to 7pm. The Chief Electoral Office released a provisional result at 12:05am on 18 September.

Party funding 
New Zealand operates on a system whereby the Electoral Commission allocates funding for advertising on television and on radio.  Parties must use their own money for all other forms of advertising, but may not use any of their own money for television or radio advertising.

{|
|-valign=top
|

*Must register for funding
Source: Electoral Commission

Controversies 

Police investigated six political parties for alleged breaches of election-spending rules relating to the 2005 election, but brought no prosecutions,
determining that "there was insufficient evidence to indicate that an offence under s214b of the Electoral Act had been committed."

The Auditor-General has also investigated publicly funded party-advertising for the 2005 election, with a leaked preliminary finding of much of the spending as unlawful. Observers expected the release of a final report in October 2006.

References

Further reading

External links 

 Elections New Zealand, joint website of the Electoral Enrolment Centre, Chief Electoral Office, and Electoral Commission.
 2005 General Election Results from the Chief Electoral Office, Ministry of Justice
 nzvotes.org, comparative information on parties, candidates and electorates
 New Zealand Herald Election 2005 website
 Stuff.co.nz Election 2005 website
 Scoop Election 2005 website
 Scoop Election 2005 campaign diary

 
September 2005 events in New Zealand